Federico "Fede" San Emeterio Díaz (born 16 March 1997) is a Spanish professional footballer who plays as a central midfielder for Cádiz CF.

Club career

Racing
Born in Sierra de Ibio, Mazcuerras, Cantabria, San Emeterio joined Racing de Santander's youth academy in 2007, aged 10. On 14 January 2014, before even having appeared with the reserves, he made his senior debut, coming on as a late substitute in a 2–0 away win against UD Almería for that season's Copa del Rey.

San Emeterio first appeared in the Segunda División B on 10 May, again from the bench in a 1–1 away draw with Coruxo FC. On 24 August he played his first match as a professional, replacing Javi Soria in the 64th minute of a 1–0 loss at Girona FC in the Segunda División.

San Emeterio contributed 35 appearances during the campaign, as his team suffered relegation. He scored his first senior goal on 4 October 2015, in a 2–0 victory at Sporting de Gijón B.

Sevilla
On 16 August 2016, both San Emeterio and his brother moved to another reserve team, signing a three-year contract with Sevilla Atlético in the second division. He netted three times from 39 games (all starts) in his second year, which ended in relegation after the last-place finish.

Valladolid
On 16 August 2018, San Emeterio joined Real Valladolid on a three-year deal, being immediately loaned to Granada CF in the second tier. He made his La Liga debut while at the service of the former club, starting the 1–1 away draw against Real Madrid on 24 August 2019.

Cádiz
On 6 January 2022, San Emeterio was loaned to top-flight side Cádiz CF until June, with a buyout clause. On 7 August, he agreed to a permanent four-year contract at the Nuevo Mirandilla.

Personal life
San Emeterio's twin brother, Borja, is also a footballer. A defender, he too was groomed at Racing.

Career statistics

References

External links

1997 births
Living people
People from Torrelavega
Spanish twins
Identical twins
Twin sportspeople
Spanish footballers
Footballers from Cantabria
Association football midfielders
La Liga players
Segunda División players
Segunda División B players
Racing de Santander players
Sevilla Atlético players
Real Valladolid players
Granada CF footballers
Cádiz CF players
Spain youth international footballers